Khoj is a Bengali psychological thriller film directed by Arka Ganguly. This film was released on 2 June 2017 in the banner of Magic Moments Motion Pictures. Khoj has won total 9 international awards at Cinema on the Bayou Film Festival, Studio city international film festival, Idyll wild international festival of cinema etc.

Plot 
Police inspector Sayan Bose of hill town, Rimtik is assigned to investigate a mysterious incident. A lady repeatedly screams from a house. This is doctor's house who does not allow any one into the house and say that it is nothing but of his wife screaming due to injection pain and that is normal. Sayan become more suspicious when the neighbors tell that they have often heard the scream but never seen the doctor's wife. One day, the doctor named Prashant Choudhury come to the police station to file a missing diary of his wife Jonaki. Sayan realizes that doctor hides something about his wife.

Cast
 Vikram Chatterjee as Sayan Bose
 Shataf Figar as Dr. Prashant Choudhury
 Sushmita Dey as Jonaki Choudhury
 Lalit Malla as Jeevan
 Punam Gurung as Rose

References

2017 films
Bengali-language Indian films
2010s Bengali-language films
Indian crime thriller films
Indian detective films
2017 crime thriller films
Films set in Darjeeling

External links